Hornsey was an ancient parish in the county of Middlesex. It was both a civil parish, used for administrative purposes, and an ecclesiastical parish of the Church of England.

Civil parish 
Hornsey Parish was probably formed in about the thirteenth century at the time a church was built in the village of Hornsey. The Parish fell within the Ossulstone Hundred of Middlesex, and in later times it was part of the Finsbury division of the Hundred. The Hornsey Parish boundary ran from Stoke Newington, in the south, through Stroud Green to Highgate in the west, and from near Colney Hatch in the north, past Muswell Hill, and a detached portion of Clerkenwell Parish, eastwards to the Tottenham Parish border and then along Green Lanes back to Stoke Newington. In the north a field called Hornsey Detached No.1 stretched up to Colney Hatch and at the southern end there were another two fields, Hornsey Detached Nos. 2 and 3 by Newington Green. The parish also owned another field in Canonbury, Islington, which was surrendered to the Parish by Sir Thomas Draper, Bt., in 1668.

The vestry of the parish was entrusted with various civil administrative functions from the 17th century. Unusually the parish was divided between the Highgate (upper) side and the Hornsey (lower) side, and separate vestry officers appointed for each side. After 1837 the civil administration changed. The Hornsey vestry established a Public Health and Drainage committee in 1851; this committee only had a short life as it was replaced, in 1854, with a Highways Board, and a full Local Board was established in 1867. The Local Board gave way to the Urban District Council in 1894/5 which governed the Parish until 1903, when it became obtained Borough status. By this time South Hornsey had separated and become an autonomous local authority from Hornsey, which had become part of the Poor Law Union of Edmonton.

In 1865, the southern part of the parish, consisting of the Brownswood Park area and the detached pieces surrounded by the parishes of Hackney and Stoke Newington adopted the Local Government Act 1858, and formed the South Hornsey Local Board.

The Local Government Act 1894 reconstituted the two local board districts as urban districts, and divided the parish into the two civil parishes of Hornsey and South Hornsey.

In 1899 the South Hornsey urban district and civil parish were absorbed by the Metropolitan Boroughs of Stoke Newington and Islington in the County of London. At the same time the detached part of the parish of Clerkenwell was added to Hornsey.

The urban district and civil parish of Hornsey remained in Middlesex, being incorporated as the Municipal Borough of Hornsey in 1903. The civil parish was abolished when the borough became part of the London Borough of Haringey in 1965.

Ecclesiastical parish 
The ancient parish, dedicated to St Mary, was in the Diocese of London. From 1862, as the population of Hornsey increased, a number of new parishes were formed:
 Hornsey, Christ Church, Crouch End in 1862
 Hornsey, Holy Innocents in 1877
 Hornsey, St Peter in 1898
 Hornsey, St Luke in 1903
 Hornsey St George in 1910

The parishes of Hornsey Rise and Hornsey Road were formed in 1865 and 1866 respectively. The two parishes were formed out of part of the area of the ancient parish of Islington.

In addition, as the population of neighbouring areas increased, parts of Hornsey parish were included in new parishes:
 Highgate in 1834
 Muswell Hill, St James in 1843
 Stoke Newington, St Matthias in 1849
 Highgate, All Saints in 1874
 Brownswood Park in 1875 was formed from the southern part of the parish
 Stroud Green in 1881
 Harringay in 1892

References

External links 
 Hornsey and Highgate 
 Local Government in Hornsey 
 View of Hornsey Church 
 Hornsey Churches 
 Hornsey Historical Society

Sources 
 Guide to the Local Administrative Units of England, Vol.1, Frederic Youngs, London, 1979

History of the London Borough of Haringey
Religion in the London Borough of Haringey
History of local government in London (pre-1855)
Former civil parishes in London
Hornsey